Little Lake Lićenat or Lake Drelaj ( or Leqinati i vogël) is a small lake found on Mount Leqinat that reaches an elevation of  in the Accursed Mountains range in western Kosovo, near the border with Montenegro. Little Lake Lićenat at a lower elevation than the much larger Lake Lićenat found in the west of it and only a hill of pine trees separates the two.

References 

Lakes of Kosovo
Accursed Mountains